Ahn Ye-eun (born May 21, 1992), is a South Korean singer-songwriter, who is best known as the runner-up of K-pop Star 5. She is well known for singing the soundtrack for the TV series The Rebel.

Discography

Studio albums

EPs

Singles

Soundtrack appearances

Compilation appearances

Filmography

Variety/Reality show

References

1992 births
Living people
South Korean singer-songwriters
Singers from Seoul
K-pop Star participants
21st-century South Korean women singers
South Korean women singer-songwriters